Miradoux is a commune in the Gers department in southwestern France.

Geography

The river Auroue forms most of the commune's western border and the Arrats all of its southeastern border.

Population

See also
Communes of the Gers department

References

Communes of Gers